El rey se divierte ("The Sports King") is a 1944 Mexican film. It was directed by 
Fernando de Fuentes.

External links
 

1944 films
1940s Spanish-language films
Films based on works by Victor Hugo
Mexican black-and-white films
Mexican fantasy comedy films
1940s fantasy comedy films
1944 comedy films
1940s Mexican films